Yakshi – Faithfully Yours is a 2012 Malayalam romantic fantasy film written and directed by debutant Abhiram Suresh Unnithan, son of veteran Malayalam director Suresh Unnithan. The film features new faces in the lead roles. The main characters of the film are inspired from the Malayalam mythology work Aithihyamala. The film released on 14 December 2012.

Plot
The classic mythological symbol of lust Naga-Yakshi, who comes down to earth on gandharva yamam and mates with virgin boys and kills them straight away after having her orgasm. Nagayakshi is a celestial creature of lust who comes to Earth, mates with virginal men and kills them after she orgasms. Things take a turn when she falls in love with two mortal non-virginal men.

Cast
 Faizal
 Avanthika Mohan
 Ved
 Akhil Devan
 Shivakumar as Inspector Mukunda Raman
 Parvathy Nair
 Manoj Madhusoodanan
 Likhiya Jamal
 Jijoy
 Vishnu Manohar
 Ambika
 Devan

Production
Yakshi – Faithfully Yours is an experimental film dealing with real time film making. The film presents the title character of Yakshi as the one who is not to be looked upon with fear or horror, but with emotions and feelings. The film started its shooting in Olappamanna Mana on 16 January 2012.

Soundtrack

The soundtrack of Yakshi – Faithfully Yours includes four major tracks composed by debutant Aravind Chandrasekhar, with lyrics from veteran poet Devadas and debutant M. T. Pradeep Kumar and one OST track from the band Downtroddence.

See also 
 List of Malayalam horror films

References

External links
 

2012 films
2010s Malayalam-language films
2010s romantic fantasy films
2012 horror films
Indian romantic horror films
Indian romantic fantasy films
Films shot in Palakkad
Films shot in Ottapalam
2012 directorial debut films